The Brainerd Water Tower is located at Sixth and Washington in Brainerd in the U.S. state of Minnesota. Built in 1918, it was the first all-concrete elevated tank used by a municipality in the United States; even though it was replaced in 1960, it remains standing as an icon of the town. It is referred to as "Paul Bunyan's Cup" or "Paul Bunyan's Flashlight" by local residents. The similar Pipestone Water Tower, also made of concrete, located in Pipestone, Minnesota, is the only other water tower in the United States known to have been designed by the architect L.P. Wolff.

References

Water towers in Minnesota
Water towers on the National Register of Historic Places in Minnesota
Buildings and structures in Crow Wing County, Minnesota
Towers completed in 1918
National Register of Historic Places in Crow Wing County, Minnesota

Brainerd, Minnesota